Cubitermitinae is an Afrotropical subfamily of higher termites with 28 known genera and 147 species. The nests are either subterranean or within the mounds of other termite species; or more famously, the epigeal mushroom-shaped nests made by species in the genus Cubitermes, characterized by one or more caps used to shield from rain. Most members of this subfamily are soil-feeders.

Identification 
The gut of workers have a specialized blind caecum/diverticulum connected to proctodeal 3 and a complex physiology that regulates the pH and oxygen supply in the gut compartments.

Soldiers have a generally subrectangular head capsule with a projection anterior to the frontal gland with the fontanelle being conspicuous and sunken in a pit or groove. The labrum is strongly bifurcated and the antennae have 14 - 15 articles (antennomeres).

Genera 
The following genera are currently recognized:

Apilitermes
Basidentitermes
Batillitermes
Crenetermes
Cubitermes
Euchilotermes
Fastigitermes
Furculitermes
Isognathotermes
Lepidotermes
Megagnathotermes
Mucrotermes
Nitiditermes
Noditermes
Okavangotermes
Ophiotermes
Orthotermes
Ovambotermes
Pilotermes
Polyspathotermes
Proboscitermes
Procubitermes
Profastigitermes
Ternicubitermes
Thoracotermes
Trapellitermes
Unguitermes
Unicornitermes

References 

Termites
Insect subfamilies